Christopher Jones (born August 6, 1979) is an American former professional road cyclist.

Major results
2009
 4th Overall Tour de Beauce
2010
 2nd Overall Tour do Rio
2012
 4th Overall Tour of Britain
2015
 3rd The Reading 120
2017
 2nd Overall Tour du Maroc
 5th Overall Tour of Alberta

References

External links

1979 births
Living people
American male cyclists
People from Redding, California